Charles Blackwell (born 20 May 1940) is an English arranger, record producer and songwriter.

Career
Born in London, Blackwell taught himself to play the piano and to write arrangements. He started working as an arranger with record producer Joe Meek at the age of eighteen, and became one of the most prolific studio arrangers and record producers of the 1960s and 1970s, with a string of hit records to his credit, including "Johnny Remember Me" by John Leyton; "What's New Pussycat", "I'll Never Fall in Love Again" by Tom Jones; and "Release Me", "A Man Without Love" by Engelbert Humperdinck. In addition, he was involved in the recordings of "Hold Me" for P.J. Proby, and in a number of hits by Kathy Kirby, including "Secret Love". Blackwell also regularly arranged and conducted studio recordings for francophone artists, including Art Sullivan, Michel Polnareff ("Love Me Please Love Me"), and Françoise Hardy ("Je Veux Qu'il Revienne" / "Only You Can Do It"). He composed a number of hits for Hardy. He had many hits with TV producer Jack Good producing for Decca Records these included The Vernon Girls, Jess Conrad, Jet Harris and Karl Denver.

He has a huge roster of artistes that he has recorded with, including Shirley Bassey, Lena Horne, Buddy Greco, Billy Fury, Adam Faith, Marlene Dietrich, Paul Anka, Françoise Hardy, Brigitte Bardot, Lulu, Vera Lynn, Slim Whitman, Bobby Goldsboro, Dionne Warwick, Gene Pitney, Brook Benton, Del Shannon and Jackie DeShannon. While in Australia in 1963 he produced "Proud of You", the biggest hit of Sydney vocalist Jay Justin's career. Charles arranged the title song for the 1960s TV series Fireball XL5, and wrote several film scores including A Place to Go (1963) and Some Girls Do (1969). He also worked with Burt Bacharach on two Peter Sellers' films, What's New Pussycat? (1965) and After the Fox (1966). He wrote the music and lyrics for the 1962 UK chart-topper "Come Outside" recorded by Mike Sarne and Wendy Richards. The million selling "Tchin Tchin" by Richard Anthony was also composed by him. Also in 1962 he was musical director for a Jimmy Savile song "Ahab the Arab" which, today (2022), would be regarded as too offensive to broadcast. It was released on the Decca record label.

In 1974, he arranged and conducted the Luxembourgian entry ("Bye Bye I Love You") at the Eurovision Song Contest in Brighton.

In the 1990s, he co-wrote a number of hits in Europe for David Hasselhoff.

In 2005, he was the arranger and musical director of the African dance stage show Sun Dance.  More recently he was commissioned by the European Parliament to orchestrate and conduct the Anthem of Europe ("Ode to Joy" by Beethoven) with a 70-man orchestra, for a new recording that is played at every parliamentary sitting.

Discography
Those Plucking Strings - Charles Blackwell and his Orchestra (2006, RPM Records)

References

External links
 

1940 births
Living people
Musicians from London
English record producers
English songwriters
British music arrangers
Eurovision Song Contest conductors
21st-century British conductors (music)
20th-century British conductors (music)
British male conductors (music)
20th-century British male musicians
21st-century British male musicians
British male songwriters